The Ouachita madtom (Noturus lachneri) is a catfish of the family Ictaluridae.The first specimens of the species were collected in 1952 it was not until 1969 that they were recognised as a species. The Ouachita madtom is similar to the tadpole madtom except the Ouachita madtom has one internasal pore while the tadpole madtom has two, and 16 to 18 anal rays while the tadpole madtom has only 14 to 16. It is also similar to the slender madtom but differing in the sack of serrae on the pectoral spine, having more caudal rays, and usually eight pectoral rays while the slender madtom has 9. The maximum length of an Ouachita madtom is about 2.7 inches.

Distribution
The Ouachita madtom was considered an Endangered Species by the IUCN in 1986 and 1988 but assessments in 1990 and 1994 showed it to be vulnerable. The Ouachita madtom is found only in the upper forks of the Saline River (Ouachita River) system and in one tributary of the Ouachita River in Central Arkansas, United States.

Habitat
A usual inhabitant of clear, small to medium, gravel-bottomed streams, the Ouachita madtom has been found in extremely shallow areas of the Saline River. It also is found in quiet backwaters under large rocks.

Reproduction
Little is known about the Ouachita madtom's reproduction. However, on August 1, 1980 six Ouachita madtoms were collected in a stream only 3.9 feet across. The six specimens were obviously young-of-the-year and their presence raised speculations that Ouachita madtoms seek smaller streams during summer months to spawn.

Known food sources
The Ouachia madtom starts feeding around 20 to 90 minutes after sunset. The following are known sources of food:
 Ephemeropterans
 Dipterans
 Coleopterans
 Trichopterans
 Isopods
 Copepods
 Gastropods

Environmental threats
 Impoundment of water supply
 Commercial gravel operations
 Channelization
 Clear cutting

Conservation
The Ouachita madtom falls under the protection of the United States' Endangered Species Act of 1973. The penalties for any form of trackifking or taking of Ouachita madtoms can be as serious as a $500,000 USD fine, 1 year imprisonment, or both. In addition to the penalties listed, civil penalties may be up to US$25,000 in fines.

See also 
 Caddo madtom: related catfish also in the Ouachita River

References

 Fishes of Arkansas, Robinson, Henry W., Thomas M. Buchanan, University of Arkansas Press, Fayetteville, 1984, pp. 307–308.
Distribution, Habitat and Food of the Quachita Madtom, Noturus lachneri, an Ouachita River Drainage Endemic
Henry W. Robison, George L. Harp. Copeia, Vol. 1985, No. 1 (Feb. 11, 1985), pp. 216–220
United States Fish and Wildlife Service Threatened and Endangered Species System

Noturus
Freshwater fish of the United States
Fish of the Eastern United States
Endemic fauna of Arkansas
Fish described in 1969
Ouachita River